Events from the year 1954 in France.

Incumbents
President: Vincent Auriol (until 16 January), Rene Coty (starting 16 January)
President of the Council of Ministers: Joseph Laniel (until 19 June), Pierre Mendès France (starting 19 June)

Events
25 January – The foreign ministers of the United States, Britain, France and the Soviet Union meet at the Berlin Conference.
13 March – Battle of Dien Bien Phu begins in Vietnam.
23 March – In Vietnam, the Viet Minh capture the main airstrip of Dien Bien Phu – French forces are partially isolated.
29 March – C-47 with French nurse Genevieve de Galard on board is incapacitated on Dien Bien Phu runway.
7 May – Battle of Dien Bien Phu ends in defeat for French forces.
18 June – Pierre Mendès France becomes prime minister of France.
24 June – Battle of Mang Yang Pass begins, the last official battle of the First Indochina War.
17 July – Battle of Mang Yang Pass ends in defeat for French forces.
20 July – Battlefield ceasefire announced.
21 July – The Geneva Conference partitions Vietnam into North Vietnam and South Vietnam.
1 August – Armistice effected, sealing French defeat.
31 October – The Algerian National Liberation Front begins a revolt against French rule.
1 November – The FLN attacks Representative and public buildings of the France colonial power.

Sport
8 July – Tour de France begins.
1 August – Tour de France ends, won by Louison Bobet.

Births
13 February – Dominique Bathenay, international soccer player
4 March – François Fillon, Prime Minister of France
1 May – Fred Chichin, musician and songwriter (died 2007)
27 July – Philippe Alliot, former motor racing driver
9 August – Loïc Amisse, soccer player and manager
12 August – François Hollande, 23rd French President
21 August – Humbert Balsan, film producer (died 2005)
17 September – Joël-François Durand, composer
8 October – Frédéric Antonetti, soccer player and manager
18 October – Edouard Stern, banker (died 2005)

Deaths
10 January – Alice Jouenne, educator, socialist activist, and writer (born 1873)
10 April – Auge Lumière, filmmaker (born 1862)
28 April – Léon Jouhaux, trade union leader who received the Nobel Peace Prize in 1951 (born 1879)
3 August – Colette, writer (born 1873)
3 November – Henri Matisse, artist (born 1869)
8 December – Claude Cahun, photographer and writer (born 1894)
23 December – René Iché, sculptor (born 1897)

See also
 List of French films of 1954

References

1950s in France